= Nelly Hanna =

Nelly Hanna is an author whose research and publications focus on Arab and Islamic Civilizations of the period from 1500 to 1800. Her scholarly work analyzes past trends and ideologies of the Middle East and Egypt. The conclusions Hanna makes are unique compared to other scholars within her research field. Her work also calls for the continued analysis of the Eurocentrism present within the ancient world. Her work has been influential and sparked conversation within scholarly debate. Her career has involved work as both an author to several books as well as teaching as a respected professor.

Nelly Hanna was born on February 23, 1942. She is currently 80 years of age. Hanna has been a professor at The American University in Cairo since 1991, holding the position of Distinguished University Professor. She works within the Department of Arab and Islamic Civilizations, which is the focus of her research. She has published several books focusing on the areas of economic, social, and cultural functions of the ancient Arab World. The time period her work focuses on is 1500 to 1800.

== Publications ==
=== Ottoman Egypt and the Emergence of the Modern World, 1500-1800 ===
Nelly Hanna's most recent publication is Ottoman Egypt and the Emergence of the Modern World, 1500-1800. This book was published in 2014. The focus of the book is to take a new approach in understanding the themes of 1500-1800 history. The most popular theme of this time period, by far, is Eurocentrism. Nelly Hanna aims to shift this historical ideology by pointing out "worldwide trends that touched not only Egypt but also India, Southeast Asia, and Europe, thus downplaying the centrality of Europe in the global picture."

=== Artisan Entrepreneurs in Cairo and Early Modern Capitalism (1600-1800) ===
Another publication of Nelly Hanna's is Artisan Entrepreneurs in Cairo and Early Modern Capitalism (1600-1800). This book was published in 2011. In this work, Nelly Hanna takes a look at the Egyptian economy before European influence. This publication examines the role artisans possess in the economy of the Ottoman Empire. Her work within Artisan Entrepreneurs in Cairo and Early Modern Capitalism (1600-1800) is monumental because the role of artisans within the Ottoman Empire had not been expanded upon in previous historical accounts. The mystery of this economic time period is clarified by Hanna through her incorporation of artisans into this time period. Hanna's interpretation creates a new outlook on the role of artisans within the Egyptian economy.

=== In Praise of Books, a Cultural History of Cairo’s Middle-Class 16-18th Centuries ===
In Praise of Books, a Cultural History of Cairo’s Middle-Class 16-18th Centuries is another one of Nelly Hanna's publications. This book sets itself apart due to its focus on middle-class Egyptian culture. Most historical Egyptian publications focus on the elites of society. This analyzation of the Egyptian middle-class is much different from traditional publications focusing on higher social classes. Hanna elaborates on the growing literacy of this time period due to several influences like accessible paper and books. Hanna also writes of the middle-class Egyptian coffeehouses that contribute to the growth of orality. Hanna's interpretation and focus of this book provides an opportunity for many to learn about this forgotten Egyptian group and show the connection between the gathering places of elites and middle-class Egyptians.

=== Making Big Money in 1600: The Life and Times of Isma`il Abu Taqiyya, Egyptian Merchant ===
Hanna has also published Making Big Money in 1600: The Life and Times of Isma`il Abu Taqiyya, Egyptian Merchant. This book focuses on the economy of the Middle East in the 1600's. The character Abu Taqiyya allows the reader to see rare insights regarding economic activities of this time period. The book goes through the life and relationships of Abu Taqiyya and emphasizes the how relations evolved greatly during this time period.

=== Other publications ===
- Habiter au Caire: La Maison Moyenne et ses habitants aux XVIIe et XVIIIe siecles, 1991
- An Urban History of Bulaq in the Mamluk and Ottoman Periods, 1983

=== General theme ===
Hanna's publications aim to reset previous historical descriptions of Eurocentric ideology within the Middle East and Egypt. Her work brings a unique outlook to Ottoman Egyptian history from 1500-1800. Hanna's opinions are unique to the research of this time period since they have not been explored in depth previously. The focus on Egyptian middle-class is especially unique. She has focused her attention to areas of Egyptian and Middle Eastern culture that have been discussed little to none before.

== Career ==
=== Education ===
Hanna received her PhD from Aix-Marseille University. Her areas of academic expertise include: "Economic History, Middle class housing in 17th and 18th Century Cairo, Ottoman History of the Arab world, and Urban History." Hanna is also fluent in Arabic, English and French.

=== Professor ===
Nelly Hanna is a professor and chair of the Department of Arab and Islamic Civilizations at the American University in Cairo. Her teaching career began with this role in 1991. Since then, Hanna has further developed her teaching career through being an active guest lecturer at several universities, including: "Ecole des Hautes Etudes en Sciences Sociales (May–June 1998), Harvard University (January–June 2001), and Waseda University, Tokyo (December 2008-January 2009)."

=== Author ===
Hanna's writing career began in 1983 with her publication An Urban History of Bulaq in the Mamluk and Ottoman Periods. She has published several other writings from 1983 to 2014. Her writing focuses on Middle Eastern and Egyptian historical cultures. Topics of her books touch on the analyzation of societal and economic trends of the 1500-1800's within the Middle East areas.
